Veronika Kudermetova and İpek Soylu were the defending champions, but Kudermetova chose to compete at the 2018 Ladies Open Lugano instead. Soylu chose to partner Anastasiya Komardina, but they lost in the quarterfinals to Akgul Amanmuradova and Tereza Smitková.

Ayla Aksu and Harriet Dart won the title, defeating Olga Doroshina and Anastasia Potapova in the final, 6–4, 7–6(7–3).

Seeds

Draw

Draw

References
Main Draw

Lale Cup - Doubles